Kalyan Silks is an Indian textile retailer. It is a subsidiary of the Kalyan Group holding company. It was started in the city of Thrissur. other branches situated at Telangana

References

Retail companies of Thrissur
Textile companies of India
Clothing retailers of India
Silk in India
Companies with year of establishment missing